Jorge Luis Delgado Rueda (born September 30, 1975 in Montevideo) is a retired Uruguayan football striker.

References

External links
 Profile at BoliviaGol.com 
 Profile & Statistics at LFP.es 

Living people
1975 births
Uruguayan footballers
Association football forwards
Liverpool F.C. (Montevideo) players
CD Numancia players
Elche CF players
Racing de Ferrol footballers
Club Nacional de Football players
Montevideo Wanderers F.C. players
Everton de Viña del Mar footballers
C.D. Cuenca footballers
C.A. Cerro players
Club Aurora players
Expatriate footballers in Ecuador
Expatriate footballers in Bolivia
Expatriate footballers in Spain
Expatriate footballers in Chile